Career Girl may refer to:
Career woman
Career Girl (1944 film), an American film by Wallace Fox
Career Girls, a 1997 British and French film by Mike Leigh
Career Girl (1960 film), an American film featuring June Wilkinson